XHZE-FM is a radio station on 92.9 FM in Santiago Ixcuintla, Nayarit. The station is owned by Radiorama and carries a Regional Mexican format known as La Poderosa.

History
XHZE began as XEZE-AM 1340, later 950. Owned by María Esperanza Cortés de Zepeda, XEZE was authorized on May 10, 1978 and sold to Radio Río, S.A. de C.V., in 1986.

It migrated to FM in 2010.

References

Radio stations in Nayarit